The 1940 SMU Mustangs football team was an American football team that represented Southern Methodist University (SMU) in the Southwest Conference (SWC) during the 1940 college football season. In their sixth season under head coach Matty Bell, the Mustangs compiled an 8–1–1 record (5–1 against conference opponents), tied for the SWC championship, outscored opponents by a total of 142 to 75, and was ranked No. 16 in the final AP Poll.

Fullback Preston Johnson was selected by both the Associated Press (AP) and the United Press as a first-team player on their 1940 All-Southwest Conference football teams. Tackle Joe Pasqua was named to the second team by the AP. Will Mullinweg and Raymond Pope were the team captains.

Schedule

References

SMU
SMU Mustangs football seasons
Southwest Conference football champion seasons
SMU Mustangs football